Brockbridge is a hamlet in Hampshire, England in the South Downs National Park .

Villages in Hampshire